Sultanovka (Soltan) is a rural locality (a village) in Kandakovsky Selsoviet, Kiginsky District, Bashkortostan, Russia. The population was 242 as of 2010. There is 1 street.

Geography 
Sultanovka is located 24 km northwest of Verkhniye Kigi (the district's administrative centre) by road. Kandakovka is the nearest rural locality.

References 

Rural localities in Kiginsky District